Operation Crusader (18 November – 30 December 1941) was a military operation of the Western Desert Campaign during the Second World War by the British Eighth Army (with Commonwealth, Indian and Allied contingents) against the Axis forces (German and Italian) in North Africa commanded by  Erwin Rommel. The operation was intended to bypass Axis defences on the Egyptian–Libyan frontier, defeat the Axis armoured forces and relieve the 1941 Siege of Tobruk.

On 18 November 1941, the Eighth Army launched a surprise attack. From 18 to 22 November, the dispersal of British armoured units led to them suffering 530 tank losses and inflicted Axis losses of about 100 tanks. On 23 November, the 5th South African Brigade was destroyed at Sidi Rezegh but inflicted many German tank casualties. On 24 November Rommel ordered the "dash to the wire" and caused chaos in the British rear echelons but allowed the British armoured forces to recover. On 27 November, the New Zealanders reached the Tobruk garrison and relieved the siege.

The battle continued into December when supply shortages forced Rommel to narrow his front and to shorten his lines of communication. On 7 December 1941, Rommel withdrew the Axis forces to the Gazala position and on 15 December he ordered a withdrawal to El Agheila. The 2nd South African Division captured Bardia on 2 January 1942, Sollum on 12 January and the fortified Halfaya position on 17 January, taking about 13,800 prisoners. On 21 January 1942, Rommel launched a surprise counter-attack and drove the Eighth Army back to Gazala where both sides regrouped. The Battle of Gazala began at the end of May 1942.

Background

Eighth Army

After the costly failure of Operation Battleaxe, General Archibald Wavell was removed as commander-in-chief of the Middle East Command and replaced by General Claude Auchinleck. The Western Desert Force was reorganised and renamed the Eighth Army, under the command of Lieutenant-General Alan Cunningham, who was replaced by Lieutenant-General Neil Ritchie. The Eighth Army had XXX Corps, under Lieutenant-General Willoughby Norrie, and XIII Corps, under Lieutenant-General Reade Godwin-Austen.

XXX Corps was made up of 7th Armoured Division (commanded by Major-General William Gott), the understrength South African 1st Infantry Division with two brigades of the Sudan Defence Force, which was newly arrived from the East African Campaign and commanded by Major-General George Brink, and the independent 22nd Guards Brigade. XIII Corps comprised 4th Indian Infantry Division (commanded by Major-General Frank Messervy), the newly arrived 2nd New Zealand Division (commanded by Major-General Bernard Freyberg) and the 1st Army Tank Brigade.

The Eighth Army also included the Tobruk garrison with the 32nd Army Tank Brigade, and the Australian 9th Division, which in late 1941 was in the process of being replaced by the British 70th Infantry Division and the Polish Carpathian Brigade (commanded by Major-General Stanisław Kopański). Australian Major General Leslie Morshead had been succeeded as Allied commander at Tobruk by British Major General Ronald Scobie. However, by November, the Australian 20th Brigade remained in Tobruk, under Brigadier John Murray.

In reserve, the Eighth Army had the South African 2nd Infantry Division, for a total equivalent of about seven divisions with 770 tanks (including many of the new Crusader Cruiser tanks, after which the operation was named, as well as new American M3 Stuart light tanks). Air support was provided by up to 724 combat aeroplanes of the Commonwealth air forces in the Middle East and Malta, with direct support under the command of Air Headquarters Western Desert.

The main Axis force in the battle was  under General Erwin Rommel. This force included:

 Deutsches Afrika Korps (Lieutenant-General Ludwig Crüwell)
 15th Panzer Division
 21st Panzer Division 
 Division zbV Afrika (a composite formation, renamed the 90th Light Africa Division in late November
(The DAK had a total of 260 tanks.)

 Italian 55th Infantry Division "Savona".

At the start of the battle, the Italian High Command (General Ettore Bastico) controlled the following additional forces in the area:
 
 XX Army Corps (Italy) (Lieutenant-General Gastone Gambara) 
 132nd Armored Division "Ariete" with 146 M13/40 medium tanks
 101st Motorized Division "Trieste"
 XXI Army Corps (Italy) (Lieutenant-General Enea Navarini)
 17th Infantry Division "Pavia"
 102nd Motorized Division "Trento"
 27th Infantry Division "Brescia"
 25th Infantry Division "Bologna"

XX Corps was placed under Rommel's direct command on 23 November.

The Axis forces had built a defensive line of strong points along the escarpment running from near the sea at Bardia and Sollum and further along the border wire to Fort Capuzzo. Elements of the 21st Panzer and the Savona divisions manned these defences. Rommel kept the rest of his forces grouped near or around the Tobruk perimeter, where an attack on 14 November had been put back to 24 November due to supply difficulties. Axis air support consisted of about 120 German and 200 Italian serviceable airplanes but these could be reinforced quickly by transfer of units from Greece and Italy.

Preparations

Axis supply

With seven Axis divisions, as well as air and naval units,  of supplies per month were needed. The Vichy French agreed to the use of Bizerta, but no supplies reached the port until late 1942. Attacks from Malta had some effect, but in May, the worst month for ship losses, 91% of supplies arrived. Lack of transport in Libya left German supplies in Tripoli, and the Italians had only  to transport supplies to  A record amount of supplies arrived in June, but at the front, shortages worsened.

There were fewer Axis attacks on Malta from June, and the British increased the proportion of ships sunk from 19% in July to 25% in September, when Benghazi was bombed and ships diverted to Tripoli, air supply in October making little difference.

In November, during Operation Crusader, a five-ship convoy was sunk, and air attacks on road convoys prevented daylight journeys.

Convoys to Tripoli resumed and ship losses increased, but by 16 December, the supply situation had eased except for the fuel shortage. In December, the Luftwaffe was restricted to one sortie per day. The Vichy French sold  of fuel, U-boats were ordered into the Mediterranean and air reinforcements sent from the Soviet Union in December. The Italian Navy used warships to carry fuel to Derna and Benghazi and made a maximum effort from 16 to 17 December. Four battleships, three light cruisers and  escorted four ships to Libya.

Eighth Army plan
Meanwhile, on their right, XIII Corps, supported by 4th Armoured Brigade (detached from 7th Armoured Division), would make a clockwise flanking advance west of Sidi Omar. They would then hold the positions threatening the rear of the line of Axis defensive strongpoints, which ran east from Sidi Omar to the coast at Halfaya.

Central to the plan was the destruction of the Axis armour by 7th Armoured Division to allow the relatively lightly armoured XIII Corps to advance north to Bardia on the coast while XXX Corps continued north-west to Tobruk and link with a breakout by the 70th Division.

That proved so successful that Rommel, refusing to believe that an attack was imminent, was not in Africa when it actually came.

Battle

First phase

18 November

The Eighth Army relied on the Desert Air Force to provide it with two clear days without serious air opposition, but torrential rain and storms on the night before the offensive caused the cancellation of all air raids, which had been planned to interdict the Axis airfields and to destroy their aircraft on the ground.

At first, all went well for the Allies. The 7th Armoured Brigade of the 7th Armoured Division advanced north-west towards Tobruk with 22nd Armoured Brigade to their left. XIII Corps and the New Zealand Division made its flanking advance with 4th Armoured Brigade on its left and 7th Infantry Brigade of the 4th Indian Division on its right flank at Sidi Omar. On the first day, no resistance was encountered as the Eighth Army closed on the enemy positions.

On the morning of 19 November, in an action at Bir el Gubi, the advance of the 22nd Armoured Brigade was blunted by the Ariete Division, which knocked out many British tanks at the start of the battle.

In the centre of the division, 7th Armoured Brigade and the 7th Support Group raced forward almost to within sight of Tobruk and took Sidi Rezegh airfield.

On the right flank, 4th Armoured Brigade came into contact that evening with a force of 60 tanks supported by 88 mm gun batteries and anti-tank units from 21st Panzer Division, which had been moving south from Gambut, and became heavily engaged.

On 20 November, 22nd Armoured Brigade fought a second engagement with the Ariete Division and 7th Armoured repulsed an infantry counterattack by the 90th Light and Bologna Divisions at Sidi Rezegh. 4th Armoured fought a second engagement with 21st Panzer and pit the speed of their Stuart tanks against the heavier German guns.

The Eighth Army was fortunate that 15th Panzer Division had been ordered to Sidi Azeiz, where there was no British armour to engage. However, 4th Armoured soon started to receive intelligence that the two German Panzer divisions were linking up. In his original battle plan, Cunningham had hoped for that so that he could bring his own larger tank force to bear and defeat the Afrika Korps armour. By attaching 4th Armoured Brigade to XIII Corps, allowing 22nd Armoured Brigade to be sidetracked fighting the Ariete Division and letting 7th Armoured Brigade forge towards Tobruk, his armoured force had become hopelessly dispersed.

22nd Armoured Brigade were therefore disengaged from the Ariete and ordered to move east and support 4th Armoured Brigade. Infantry and artillery elements of 1st South African Division were to hold the Ariete, and 4th Armoured were released from their role of defending XIII Corps' flank.

In the afternoon of 20 November, 4th Armoured were engaged with 15th Panzer Division (21st Panzer having temporarily withdrawn for lack of fuel and ammunition). It was too late in the day for a decisive action, but 4th Armoured lost some 40 tanks and had been down to less than two-thirds their original strength of 164 tanks. 22nd Armoured arrived at dusk, too late to have an impact, and during the night of 20 November, Rommel pulled all his tanks north-west for an attack on Sidi Rezegh.

Tobruk

The Eighth Army plans for 21 November were for 70th Division to break out from Tobruk and to cut off the Germans to the south-east. The 7th Armoured would advance from Sidi Rezegh to link with them and roll up the Axis positions around Tobruk. The 70th Division attack surprised the Axis since Rommel had underestimated the size and the armoured strength of the garrison. On the evening of 20 November, Scobie ordered a break-out on 21 November by the 70th Division (2nd/King's Own, 2nd BlackWatch, 2nd/Queen's and 4th RTR with Matilda tanks). The Polish Carpathian Brigade was to mount a diversion just before dawn to pin the Pavia Division. During the operation, 100 guns were to bombard the Bologna, Brescia and Pavia positions on the Tobruk perimeter with 40,000 rounds.

Fighting was intense as the three-pronged attack consisted of the 2nd King's Own on the right flank, the 2nd Battalion, Black Watch, as the central force and the 2nd Queen's Own on the left flank. They advanced to capture a series of prepared strongpoints leading to Ed Duda. Initially, the Italians were stunned by the massive fire, and a company of the Pavia was overrun in the predawn darkness, but resistance in the Bologna gradually stiffened.

By mid-afternoon, elements of 70th Division had advanced some  toward Ed Duda on the main supply road when they paused, as it became clear that 7th Armoured would not link up.

The central attack by the Black Watch involved a murderous charge under heavy machine gun fire and attacking and taking various strongpoints until they reached the strongpoint Tiger. The Black Watch lost an estimated 200 men and the commanding officer.

The British renewed their advance, but the attack petered out since the infantry involved could not capture the Bologna defences around the Tugun strongpoint.

On 21 November, another fierce action was fought with high casualties by elements of the German 155th Rifle Regiment, Artillery Group Bottcher, 5th Panzer Regiment and the British 4th, 7th and 22nd Armoured Brigades for possession of Sidi Rezegh and the surrounding height in the hands of Italian infantry and anti-tank gunners of the Bologna.

On 22 November, General Scobie ordered the position to be consolidated and the corridor widened in the hope that the Eighth Army would link up. The 2nd York and Lancaster Regiment with tank support took the strongpoint Tiger and left a  gap between the corridor and Ed Duda, but efforts to clear the Tugun and Dalby Square strong points were repelled. In the fighting on the 22nd, the Tugun's defenders brought down devastating fire and reduced the strength in one attacking British company to merely 33 all ranks.

Second phase

Sidi Rezegh

On 23 November, the 70th Division in Tobruk attacked the 25th Bologna Infantry Division in an attempt to reach the area of Sidi Rezegh, but elements of the Pavia soon arrived and broke up the British attack. On 26 November, Scobie ordered a successful attack on the Ed Duda ridge, and in the early morning of 27 November, the Tobruk garrison linked up with a small force of New Zealanders.

7th Armoured had planned its attack northward to Tobruk to start at 08.30 on 21 November, but at 07.45, patrols reported the arrival from the south-east of a mass of enemy armour of some 200 tanks in all. 7th Armoured Brigade, together with a battery of field artillery, turned to meet the threat and left the four companies of infantry and the artillery of the Support Group to carry out the attack to the north in anticipation of being reinforced by 5th South African Infantry Brigade. It had been detached from the 1st South African Division at Bir el Gubi, which faced the Ariete Division, and was heading north to join them.

Without armoured support, the northward attack by the Support Group failed. By the end of the day, 7th Armoured Brigade had lost the bulk (28 of its 60) tanks and been relying mainly on the artillery of the Support Group to hold the enemy at arm's length.

The South African brigade was dug in south-east of Bir el Haiad but, the German armour was between them and Sidi Rezegh.

That presented a clear opportunity for a breakthrough to Tobruk with the whole of 7th Armoured Division concentrated and facing only the weakened 21st Panzer. However, XXX Corps Commander Norrie, aware that 7th Armoured division was down to 200 tanks, decided on caution.

In the early afternoon, Rommel instead attacked Sidi Rezegh with 21st Panzer and captured the airfield. Fighting was desperate and gallant. For his actions during both days of fighting, Brigadier Jock Campbell, who commanded 7th Support Group, was awarded the Victoria Cross. However, 21st Panzer, despite being considerably weaker in armour, proved superior in its combined arms tactics and pushed 7th Armoured Division back with a further 50 tanks lost (mainly from 22nd Brigade).

The fighting at Sidi Rezegh continued until 22 November, with the South African Division's 5th Brigade had become engaged to the south of the airfield. An attempt to recapture it failed, and the Axis counteroffensive began to gain momentum. 7th Armoured Brigade withdrew; all but four of their 150 tanks had become out of commission or destroyed. In four days, the Eighth Army had lost 530 tanks; Axis losses had been about 100.

The most memorable action during the North African Campaign of the 3rd Field Regiment (Transvaal Horse Artillery) was during the Battle of Sidi Rezegh, on 23 November 1941. The South Africans were surrounded on all sides by German armour and artillery and were subjected to a continuous barrage. They tried to take cover in shallow slit trenches. The Transvaal Horse Artillery engaged German tanks from the 15th and the 21st Panzer Divisions, the gunners firing over open sights as they were overrun. That continued until many of the officers had died, and the gunners had run out of ammunition.

Many of the gun crews were captured. As darkness fell, those who could do so escaped back to Allied lines under the cover of darkness. The gunners of the 3rd Field Regiment managed to save five of their 24 guns from the battlefield and later recovered seven other guns. After the Battle of Sidi Rezegh, Acting Lieutenant General Sir Charles Willoughby Moke Norrie stated that the South African "sacrifice resulted in the turning point of the battle, giving the Allies the upper hand in North Africa at that time".

Frontier
On the XIII Corps front on 22 November, the 5th New Zealand Brigade advanced north-east to capture Fort Capuzzo on the main Sollum–Bardia road. The Brigade attacked Bir Ghirba, south of Fort Capuzzo and the headquarters of the Savona Division but was repulsed.

To the south, the 7th Indian Brigade captured Sidi Omar and most of the Libyan Omar strongpoints, which were the two westernmost strong points of the Axis border defences. Losses in its supporting tank units caused a delay in attacks on the other strong points until replacements had arrived. One of the New Zealand military unit's historians described the fighting days as the 7th Indian Brigade's most difficult, with the men of the 4/16th Punjab Battalion having "fought all morning to overcome resistance" and the German 12th Oasis Company having "formed the backbone of the defence of the whole position".

On 23 November, the 5th New Zealand Brigade continued its advance south-east, down the main road from Fort Capuzzo towards Sollum, and cut off of the Axis positions from Sidi Omar to Sollum and Halfaya from Bardia and its supply route. The 6th New Zealand Brigade Group on the left flank at Bir el Hariga, had been ordered north-west along the Trigh Capuzzo (Capuzzo–El Adem) to reinforce 7th Armoured Division at Sidi Rezegh.

It stumbled on the Afrika Korps headquarters and captured most of its staff (Crüwell was absent). No supplies reached either panzer division that day. Later that day, the 4th New Zealand Brigade Group was sent north of the 6th New Zealand Brigade to apply pressure on Tobruk, and the 5th New Zealand Brigade covered Bardia and the Sollum–Halfaya positions.

In the pocket were the remains of 7th Armoured Division, 5th South African Infantry Brigade and elements of the recently arrived 6th NZ Brigade. By the end of the day, the 5th South African Brigade had been destroyed. What remained of the defending force broke out of the pocket and headed south towards Bir el Gubi.  in Rome agreed to put the XX Mobile Corps, including the Ariete Armoured Division and the Trieste Motorised Division, under Rommel's command.

By 23 November, Ariete, Trieste and Savona had knocked out about 200 British tanks, and a similar number of vehicles were disabled or destroyed. From 19 to 23 November, around British 350 tanks were destroyed and 150 severely damaged. Axis losses were considerable, with the  down to 40 operational tanks.

Dash to the wire
He hoped to relieve the Siege of Bardia and the frontier garrisons, and to pose enough of a threat to the British rear echelon to complete the defeat of Operation Crusader. They headed for Sidi Omar, causing chaos, scattering the mainly rear echelon support units in their path and splitting XXX Corps and almost cutting off XIII Corps.

On 25 November, the 15th Panzer Division set off north-east for Sidi Azeiz, found the area empty and was constantly attacked by the Desert Air Force. A second attack left the 5th Panzer Regiment with few operational tanks. The rest of 21st Panzer Division had headed north-east, south of the border, to Halfaya.

The Axis column had only a tenuous link to its supply dumps on the coast between Bardia and Tobruk, and supply convoys had to find a way past the 4th and 6th NZ Brigade Groups. On 26 November, the 15th Panzer Division, bypassed Sidi Azeiz, headed for Bardia for supplies and arrived around mid-day. The remains of the 21st Panzer Division attacked north-west of Halfaya towards Capuzzo and Bardia. , approaching Bir Ghirba ( north-east of Sidi Omar) from the west, was ordered towards Fort Capuzzo to clear any opposition and link with the 21st Panzer Division. They were to be supported by the depleted 115th Infantry Regiment of the 15th Panzer Division, which was to advance with some artillery south-east from Bardia toward Fort Capuzzo.

The two battalions of the 5th NZ Brigade, between Fort Capuzzo and Sollum Barracks, were engaged by the converging elements of the 15th and the 21st Panzer divisions at dusk on 26 November. During the night, the 115th Infantry Regiment got to within  of Capuzzo but was disengaged to switch its attack towards Upper Sollum, where it met 21st Panzer, coming from the south. In the early hours of 27 November, Rommel met with the commanders of the 15th and 21st Panzer Divisions at Bardia.

The  had to return to the Tobruk front, where the 70th Infantry Division and the New Zealand Division had gained the initiative. On 25 November, in the Trento Division sector, the 2nd Battalion Queens Royal Regiment attacked the  strongpoint but was repulsed.

Afterwards  Fritz Bayerlein wrote:

Rommel ordered the 21st Panzer Division back to Tobruk, and the 15th Panzer Division was to attack forces that were thought to besiege the border positions between Fort Capuzzo and Sidi Omar. The 15th Panzer Division first had to capture Sidi Azeiz to provide space for the ambitious manoeuvre. Neumann-Silkow felt the plan to have little chance of success and resolved to advance to Sidi Azeiz, where he believed there was a British supply dump, before he headed to Tobruk.

Defending the 5th Brigade Headquarters at Sidi Azeiz were a company of the 22nd New Zealand Infantry Battalion and the armoured cars of the New Zealand divisional cavalry, with some field artillery, anti-tank, anti-aircraft and machine gun units. The New Zealanders were overrun early on 27 November, Rommel congratulated Brigadier James Hargest on the determined New Zealand defence and 700 prisoners were taken although the armoured cars escaped.

The 21st Panzer Division ran into the 5th NZ Brigade 22nd battalion at Bir el Menastir while it was heading west to Tobruk from Bardia. After an exchange lasting most of the day, it was forced to detour south via Sidi Azeiz, which delayed its return to Tobruk by a day. The audacious manoeuvre by Afrika Korps had failed but come within  of the main supply base of the Eighth Army.

The dash of the Afrika Korps to the south removed a severe threat to the left flank of the New Zealand Division, which had remained ignorant of the danger because news of the losses of the 7th Armoured Division had not reached XIII Corps and German tank losses had been wildly overestimated.

The 70th Infantry Division resumed its attack on 26 November, and the next day, elements linked with the advancing New Zealanders of the 4th NZ Brigade at Ed Duda on the Tobruk by-pass. The 6th NZ Brigade cleared the Sidi Rezegh escarpment in a mutually-costly engagement.

Third phase

27 November

At mid-day on 27 November, the 15th Panzer Division reached Bir el Chleta and met the 22nd Armoured Brigade, which had been reorganised as a composite regiment with fewer than 50 tanks. The 15th Panzer Division was also suffering many losses from bombing. As night fell, the British tanks disengaged to replenish but inexplicably moved south to do so, which left the route west open for the 15th Panzer Division. Once again, the New Zealand Division, engaged in heavy fighting on the south-eastern end of the tenuous corridor into Tobruk, would be under threat from the Afrika Korps.

By 27 November, the situation of the Eighth Army had improved since XXX Corps had reorganised after the chaos of the breakthrough, and the New Zealand Division had linked up with the Tobruk garrison. Auchinleck had spent three days during the breakthrough with Cunningham, who had wanted to halt the offensive and withdraw.

However, Auchinleck handed Cunningham written orders on 25 November that included the sentence "...There is only one order, Attack and Pursue" On his return to Cairo on 26 November, after conferring with his superiors, Auchinleck relieved Cunningham and promoted his deputy chief of staff, Major-General Neil Ritchie, to acting lieutenant-general.

Tobruk corridor

From 26 to 27 November, in a determined attack, the 70th Infantry Division killed or captured the Italian defenders of several concrete pillboxes before they reached Ed Duda. On 27 November, the 6th New Zealand Brigade fought a fierce battle with a battalion of the 9th Bersaglieri Regiment, which had dug themselves around the Prophet's Tomb and used their machine guns to great effect. 6th NZ Brigade managed to link up with the 32nd Tank Brigade at Ed Duda. The 6th and 32nd Brigades secured a small bridgehead on the Tobruk Front, which lasted five days.

By 28 November, Bologna had regrouped largely in the Bu Amud and Belhamed areas, and the division had stretched out along  from the Via Balbia to the Bypass Road and fought in several places. The Reuters correspondent with the Tobruk garrison wrote on 28 November:

On the night of 27/28 November, Rommel had discussed plans for the next day with Crüwell and indicated that Rommel's priority was to cut the Tobruk Corridor and to destroy the enemy forces fighting there. Crüwell wanted to eliminate the threat of the 7th Armoured Division tanks to the south, which he felt needed attention first. 15th Panzer spent most of 28 November once more engaged with 4th and 22nd Armoured and dealt with supply problems. Despite being outnumbered 2–1 in tanks and at times being immobile because of lack of fuel, 15th Panzer pushed the British tank force southward and moved westward.

Fierce fighting continued on 28 November around the Tobruk Corridor, with the battle ebbing and flowing. It had not been possible to create a firm communications link between 70th and 2nd New Zealand Divisions, which made co-ordination between the two somewhat difficult. When two Italian motorised battalions of Bersaglieri, with supporting tanks, anti-tank guns and artillery, moved toward Sidi Rezegh, they overran a New Zealand field hospital. The Bersaglieri captured 1,000 patients and 700 medical staff. They also freed some 200 Germans who were held captive in the enclosure on the grounds of the hospital. The New Zealand Official History mentions the capture of 1,000 patients and implies that they were captured by Germans:

At 6 p.m., the Australian 2/13th Battalion moved to reinforce Ed Duda, where some platoons suffered severe casualties from the intense shelling.

On the night of 28 November Rommel rejected Crüwell's plan for a direct advance towards Tobruk since Rommel had had no success with head-on attacks on Tobruk during the months of the siege. He decided on a circling movement to attack Ed Duda from the south-west, to carry on through to cut off the enemy forces outside the Tobruk perimeter and to destroy them.

On the morning of 29 November, 15th Panzer set off west, travelling south of Sidi Rezegh. The remnants of 21st Panzer were supposed to be moving up on their right to form a pincer, but were in disarray when von Ravenstein failed to return from a reconnaissance that morning (he had been captured). In the afternoon, to the east of Sidi Rezegh, on the much-contested Point 175, elements of Ariete overran 21st NZ Battalion. The New Zealanders were caught wrong-footed since they had mistaken the attackers for reinforcements from the 1st South African Brigade, which had been due to arrive from the south-west to reinforce XIII Corps.

Lieutenant-Colonel Howard Kippenberger, who later rose to command the New Zealand 2nd Division noted:

 The 24th and 26th Battalions met a similar fate at Sidi Rezegh on 30 November. On 1 December, a German armoured attack on Belhamed practically destroyed the 20th Battalion. The New Zealanders suffered heavily in the attacks, with 879 dead, 1,699 wounded and 2,042 captured.

Meanwhile, the leading elements of 15th Panzer had reached Ed Duda, but they made little progress before nightfall against determined defences. However, a counterattack by 4th Royal Tank Regiment supported by Australian infantry recaptured the lost positions, and the German units fell back  to form a new position.

On 29 November, the two British Armoured Brigades were strangely passive. 1st SA Brigade was tied to the armoured brigades and unable to move in open ground without them because of the threat from the panzer divisions. On the evening of 29 November, 1st SA Brigade was placed under command of 2nd New Zealand Division and ordered to advance north to recapture Point 175. Meanwhile, radio intercepts had given the Eighth Army to believe that 21st Panzer and Ariete were in trouble, and Ritchie had ordered 7th Armoured Division to "stick to them like hell".

Eight Matilda tanks provided the preliminary bombardment for a counterattack by two companies of the 2/13th Australian Infantry Battalion on the night of 29/30 November. In a bayonet charge against German positions, the 2/13th had two killed and five wounded and took 167 prisoners.

After the resistance at Ed Duda, Rommel decided to withdraw 15th Panzer to Bir Bu Creimisa,  to the south, and to relaunch his attack northeast from there on 30 November. He aimed between Sidi Rezegh and Belhamed and to leave Ed Duda outside his encircling pocket. By mid-afternoon, 6th New Zealand Brigade had been heavily pressed on the western end of the Sidi Rezegh position. The weakened 24th Battalion was overrun as were two companies of 26th Battalion, but on the eastern flank of the position, 25th Battalion repelled an attack from Ariete moving from Point 175.

At 06:15 on 1 December, 15th Panzer renewed their attack towards Belhamed, supported by a massive artillery effort, and once again, 2nd New Zealand Division came under intense pressure. During the morning, 7th Armoured Division was ordered to advance to provide direct assistance; 4th Armoured Brigade arrived at Belhamed and may have had the opportunity for a decisive intervention since they outnumbered the 40 or so 15th Panzer Division tanks attacking the position. However, they believed their orders to be to cover the withdrawal of the remains of 6th NZ Brigade, which precluded an offensive operation.

The remains of 2nd NZ Division were now concentrated near Zaafran, 5 mi east of Belhamed and slightly further north-east of Sidi Rezegh. During the morning of 1 December, Freyberg, commanding 2nd NZ, saw a signal from the Eighth Army indicating that 1st SA Brigade would be under the command of 7th Armoured Division. He inferred that Army Headquarters had lost hope of holding the Tobruk corridor. He signalled in mid-morning that without the South Africans, his position would be untenable and so he was planning a withdrawal. Freyberg ordered 2nd NZ to be ready to move east at 1730. 15th Panzer, which had been resupplying, renewed its attack at 1630 and Trieste cut the tenuous link established with Tobruk. 2nd NZ became involved in a desperate fighting withdrawal from its western positions. Showing admirable discipline, they formed up by 1330, and having paused an hour for the tanks and artillery to join them from the west, set off at 1845. They reached the XXX Corps lines with little further interruption. In the early hours, the 3,500 men and 700 vehicles that had emerged headed back to Egypt.

Sollum

Once again, Rommel became concerned with the cut-off units in the border strongpoints. On 2 December, believing that he had won the battle at Tobruk, he sent the Geissler Advance Guard and the Knabe Advanced Guard battalion groups to open the routes to Bardia and to Capuzzo and then Sollum. On 3 December, the Geissler Advance Guard were heavily defeated by elements of 5th NZ Brigade on the Bardia road near Menastir. To the south the Knabe force at the same time fared slightly better on the main track to Capuzzo (Trigh Capuzzo), coming up against 'Goldforce' (based on the Central India Horse reconnaissance regiment) and retiring after an artillery exchange.

Rommel insisted once again on trying to relieve the frontier forts. Since Afrika Korps tanks were undergoing overhaul, he ordered the rest of 15th Panzer and the Italian Mobile Corps eastwards on 4 December, which caused considerable alarm at the Eighth Army headquarters. However, Rommel soon realised he could not deal with the situation at Tobruk if he sent a strong force east, and the Ariete went no further than Gasr el Arid.

Ed Duda
On 4 December, Rommel launched a renewed attack on Ed Duda that was repulsed by 70th Division's 14th Infantry Brigade. When it was clear that the attack would fail, Rommel resolved to withdraw from the eastern perimeter of Tobruk to allow him to concentrate his strength against the growing threat of XXX Corps to the south.

Bir el Gubi

After the withdrawal of 2nd NZ Division, Ritchie had reorganised his rear echelon units to release the 5th and 11th Indian Infantry Brigades of the 4th Indian Infantry Division and the 22nd Guards Brigade. The I and II battalions, 136th "Giovani Fascisti" Regiment in the hilltop position repulsed several attacks by British armour and Indian infantry units in the first week of December:

The Eighth Army infantry were left vulnerable because Norrie had been ordered to send the 4th Armoured Brigade east due to the threat to Bardia and Sollum. On 4 December, the Pavia and Trento Divisions counter-attacked the 70th Infantry Division to contain them within the Tobruk perimeter and reportedly recaptured the Plonk and Doc strongpoints. On 5 December, the 11th Indian Infantry Brigade continued its attritional attack against Point 174. The 11th Indian Brigade had to be withdrawn to be refitted and replaced by the 22nd Guards Brigade.

Crüwell could have attacked on 6 December, as the 4th Armoured Brigade made no move to close up to the 22nd Guards Brigade but his hesitation prevented him from striking a conclusive blow before dark. By 7 December, the 4th Armoured Brigade had closed up and the opportunity had been lost. Neumann-Silkow, the commander of the 15th Panzer Division, was mortally wounded late on 6 December.

Gazala line
On 7 December, the 4th Armoured Brigade engaged the 15th Panzer Division, disabling 11 more tanks. Rommel had been told on 5 December by the Italian  that supply could not improve until the end of the month with the start of the airborne supply from Sicily. Realising that success was now unlikely at Bir el Gubi, he decided to narrow his front and to shorten his lines of communication by abandoning the Tobruk front and withdrawing to the positions at Gazala,  to his rear. They had been prepared by Italian rear echelon units and had been occupied by 8 December. He placed the Italian X Corps at the coastal end of the line and the Italian XXI Corps inland. The weakened Italian Mobile Corps anchored the southern end of the line at Alem Hamza while the Afrika Korps were placed behind the southern flank ready to counter-attack.

On 6 December, Rommel ordered his divisions to retreat westwards and left Savona to hold out as long as possible in the Sollum, Halfaya and Bardia area; they held out for six more weeks. That night, the 70th Division captured the German-held Walter and Freddie strong points without any resistance. A Pavia battalion, dug in on Point 157, inflicted heavy casualties on the 2nd Durham Light Infantry, before it was overcome after midnight. Although the 90th Light Division pulled out of the Tobruk sector on 4 December, Bologna held out until the night of 8/9 December, when trucks were finally assigned to give them some support. In a final action on the part of the 70th Division, the Polish Carpathian Brigade attacked elements of Brescia, followed the Axis retreat and captured the White Knoll position. That finally relieved the Tobruk defenders after a 19-day battle.

Better to co-ordinate his infantry and armour, Ritchie transferred the 7th Armoured Division to XIII Corps and directed the XXX Corps HQ to take the 2nd South African Division under command to conduct a siege of the border fortresses. He also sent forward to XIII Corps the 4th Indian Infantry Division and the 5th NZ Infantry Brigade. The Eighth Army launched its attack on the Gazala line on 13 December and the 5th NZ Brigade attacked along an  front from the coast. The 5th Indian Infantry Brigade made a flanking attack at Alem Hamza. Although Trieste held Alem Hamza, the 1st Battalion, The Buffs from the 5th Indian Infantry Division took Point 204, some miles west of Alem Hamza. They were thus left in a salient and the 7th Indian Infantry Brigade to their left was ordered to send northwards the 4th battalion 11th Sikh Regiment, supported by guns from the 25th Field Regiment RA and twelve Valentine tanks from the 8th Royal Tank Regiment, to ease their position. The force found itself confronted by the Afrika Korps, fielding 39 tanks and 300 lorries of infantry and guns. Once again, the 7th Armoured Division was not in place to intervene and it was left to the force's artillery and supporting tanks to face the threat. They took heavy casualties but managed to knock out 15 German tanks and repulse the counter-attack.

Godwin-Austen ordered Gott to get the British armour to a position from where it could engage the Afrika Korps since he was unaware that Gott and his senior commanders were no longer confident they could defeat the enemy directly, despite their superiority in numbers. Due to the Germans' superior tactics and anti-tank artillery, British commanders preferred making a wide detour to attack their soft-skinned elements and lines of supply, to immobilise them. On 14 December, the Polish Independent Brigade was brought forward to join the New Zealanders and prepare a new attack for the early hours of 15 December. The attack went in at 03:00, taking the defenders by surprise. Both brigades made good progress but narrowly failed to breach the line.

On 14 December, to the south, there was little activity from the Afrika Korps and the 7th Indian Infantry Brigade was limited to patrolling through a shortage of ammunition as supply problems multiplied. At Alem Hamza, the 5th Indian Infantry Brigade attacked again but made no progress against determined resistance and at Point 204 the 5th Indian Brigade's battalion of Royal East Kent Regiment ("The Buffs"), supported by ten I tanks, an armoured car squadron of the Central India Horse, a company of Bombay Sappers and Miners, the artillery of 31st Field Regiment RA and elements of the 73rd Anti-Tank Regiment and some anti-aircraft guns, were attacked by ten or twelve tanks, the remnants of Ariete, which they beat off.

On 15 December, Brescia and Pavia, with Trento in close support, repelled a strong Polish–New Zealand attack, freeing the 15th Panzer Division, which had returned to the Gazala Line, to be used elsewhere.

Rommel considered Point 204 a key position and many of the neighbouring armoured and infantry units were committed to attack it on 15 December. In fierce and determined fighting, the attacking force, Ariete, the 15th Panzer Division, with 8th Bersaglieri Regiment and 115th Lorried Infantry Regiment, overran the Buffs and its supporting elements during the afternoon. The Buffs lost over 1,000 men killed or captured with only 71 men and a battery of field artillery escaping. It was too late in the day for the attacking force to collect itself and to advance further to intervene at Alem Hamza. The attackers also had suffered heavily in the engagement and the German commander was heard on a radio intercept to report the inability of his force to exploit his success because of the losses sustained. By 15 December, Afrika Korps were down to eight operational tanks and Ariete about thirty. Rommel, who had greater respect for  the 7th Armoured Division than either Crüwell (or apparently even Gott), became very concerned about a perceived flanking move to the south by the British armour. Despite the vehement objections of the Italian generals and Crüwell, Rommel ordered an evacuation of the Gazala line on the night of the 15/16 December.

Early on 16 December, only a small detachment was sent north, which caused serious confusion among Panzer Group Afrika's rear echelon but was not decisive and the rest of the brigade headed south to meet its petrol supplies. In the afternoon, the 15th Panzer Division, moving west, passed by the rear of the 4th Armoured Brigade and blocked any return move to the north. The mere presence of the British armour had prompted Rommel to withdraw from Gazala but the opportunity for the British to gain a big victory had been missed.

Aftermath

Over the following ten days, Rommel's forces withdrew to a line between Ajedabia and El Haseia, maintained his lines of communication, and avoided being cut off and surrounded, unlike the Italians the previous year. As his lines of supply shortened and supplies to El Agheila improved, he rebuilt his tank force and so the Eighth Army lines of supply became more and more stretched. On 27 December, Rommel was able in a three-day tank battle at El Haseia to inflict heavy damage on the 22nd Armoured Brigade, which forced the leading echelons of the Eighth Army to withdraw. That allowed the Axis forces to fall back to a tactically more-desirable defensive line at El Agheila in the first two weeks of January without having to deal with pressure from the enemy.

Auchinleck's determination and Ritchie's aggression had removed the Axis threat to Egypt and the Suez Canal for now. However, the Axis strongholds on the Libya–Egypt border remained, despite Rommel's recommendation for an evacuation by sea and to block the coast road and tie down Allied troops. In early December, the Allies decided that clearing the Axis frontier positions was essential to facilitate their supply lines and maintain the momentum of their advance. On 16 December, the 2nd South African Division commenced an attack on Bardia, garrisoned by 2,200 German and 6,600 Italian troops, and on 2 January 1942, the port fell. Sollum fell to the South Africans on 12 January after a small but fiercely-fought engagement. They surrounded the fortified Halfaya Pass position (which included the escarpment, the plateau above it and the surrounding ravines) and cut it off from the sea. The Halfaya garrison of 4,200 Italians of the 55th Infantry Division "Savona" and 2,100 Germans was already desperately short of food and water. The defences allowed the garrison to hold out against heavy artillery and aerial bombardment with relatively few casualties, but hunger and thirst forced a capitulation on 17 January. Rommel reported of General Fedele de Giorgis: "Superb leadership was shown by the Italian General de Giorgis, who commanded this German-Italian force in its two months' struggle".

On 21 January, Rommel launched a surprise counterattack from El Agheila. Although the action had originally been a "reconnaissance in force", since Rommel found the Eighth Army forward elements to be dispersed and tired, he took advantage, in his typical manner, of the situation and drove the Eighth Army back to Gazala where they took up defensive positions along Rommel's old line. A stalemate set in as both sides regrouped, rebuilt and reorganised. It may have proved a limited success, but Operation Crusader showed that the Axis could be beaten and was a fine illustration of the dynamic back-and-forth fighting that characterised the North African campaign. Geoffrey Cox wrote that Sidi Rezegh was the "forgotten battle" of the Desert War. Crusader was "won by a hair’s breadth" by the Eighth Army but "had we lost it, we would have had to fight the battle of Alamein six months or a year earlier, without the decisive weapon of the Sherman tank".

See also

 List of World War II Battles
 North African campaign timeline
 List of World War II North Africa Airfields
 List of British military equipment of World War II
 List of Australian military equipment of World War II
 List of German military equipment of World War II
 List of Italian military equipment in World War II

Notes

References

Sources

Further reading

External links

 The 2nd Battalion The Blackwatch At Tobruk 
 BBC – WW2 People's War – Operation Crusader
 Operation Crusader and Rommel's Dash To The Wire
 The Crusader Project

 Animated Map of Operation Crusader
 Operation Crusader animated battle map by Mark Cannon

North African campaign
Western Desert campaign
Libya in World War II
Egypt in World War II
Battles and operations of World War II involving Italy
Crusader
Battles and operations of World War II involving Australia
Battles and operations of World War II involving New Zealand
Battles and operations of World War II involving India
Battles and operations of World War II involving Poland
Battles of World War II involving Italy
Battles and operations of World War II involving Czechoslovakia
Conflicts in 1941
1941 in Egypt
Military operations of World War II involving Germany
Erwin Rommel